Stephen Moss (born in 1960) is an English natural historian, birder, author, and television producer.

Biography
He is best known for producing wildlife series, many of them presented by Bill Oddie, including:
Birding with Bill Oddie (three series, 1997, 1998, and 2000)
Bill Oddie Goes Wild (three series, 2001, 2002, and 2003)
Wild In Your Garden (2003)
Bill Oddie's How to Watch Wildlife (2004)
Springwatch with Bill Oddie (2005)
Birds Britannia (2010)

For some of his BBC series, he also authored accompanying books. He left the BBC in 2011 to work as a freelancer.
He lectures at Bath Spa University and is a visiting professor at the University of Nottingham.

In 2009, he was one of the first recipients of the British Trust for Ornithology's Dilys Breese Medal, at a ceremony at the House of Lords.

He is married, with five children, and lives in Somerset, having moved there from West London.

Radio programmes
 A Guide to Garden Birds

Bibliography 
BBC Weather Watch (BBC Books 1992), with Paul Simons
Birds and Weather: A Birdwatchers' Guide (Hamlyn 1995), 
The Complete Garden Bird Book: How to Identify and Attract Birds to Your Garden (New Holland 1996), with Mark Golley
Birding with Bill Oddie (BBC Books 1997), with Bill Oddie
Attracting Birds to Your Garden (New Holland 1998), 
Gardening for Birds: How to Help Birds Make the Most of Your Garden (HarperCollins 2000),  (repr. 2004 as Bird-friendly Garden)
Bird Boxes and Feeders: Featuring 11 Step-by-step Woodworking Projects (New Holland 2001), with Alan & Gill Bridgewater
The Garden Bird Handbook: How to Attract, Identify and Watch the Birds in Your Garden (New Holland 2003), 
Understanding Bird Behaviour (New Holland 2003), 
How to Birdwatch (New Holland 2003), 
Blokes and Birds (New Holland 2003),  (ed.)
Garden Birds (HarperCollins 2004), 
A Bird in the Bush: A Social History of Birdwatching (Aurum 2004), 
Everything You Wanted to Know About Birds… But Were Afraid to Ask! (Christopher Helm 2005), 
Bill Oddie's How to Watch Wildlife (HarperCollins 2005), with Bill Oddie and Fiona Pitcher
This Birding Life: The Best of The Guardian's "Birdwatch" (Aurum 2006), 
The Private Life of Birds (New Holland 2006), 
Birder's Companion (Firefly 2007), 
The Bumper Book of Nature (Square Peg), 
A Sky Full of Starlings: A Diary of a Birding Year (Aurum 2008), 
Wild Hares and Hummingbirds: The Natural History of an English Village (Square Peg, 2011), 
Wild Kingdom: Bringing Back Britain's Wildlife (Square Peg, 2016),()
The Robin: A Biography (Square Peg, 2017) The Wren: A Biography (Square Peg, 2018) 
Mrs Moreau's Warbler: How Birds Got Their Names (Guardian Faber, 2018) 
Dynasties: The Rise and Fall of Animal Families (BBC Books, 2018)  with David Attenborough
The Accidental Countryside: Hidden Havens for Britain’s Wildlife (Guardian Faber, 2020) 
 Skylarks with Rosie: A Somerset Spring (Saraband, 2021)

References

External links
Stephen Moss's Twitter stream (verified at )
Articles written by Moss in The Guardian

The Official "The Bumper Book of Nature" website with podcasts, quizzes and a blog by Stephen Moss

Living people
English ornithologists
English nature writers
1960 births